Mickey Rooney (1920–2014) was an American actor of stage, film, television, Broadway, radio, and vaudeville. Beginning as a child actor, his career extended over 88 years, making him one of the most enduring performers in show business history. He appeared in more than 300 films and was one of the last surviving stars of the silent film era, having one of the longest careers in the medium's history.

Film

Stage

 1935: A Midsummer Night's Dream
 1951: Sailor Beware
 1963: The Tunnel of Love
 1965: A Funny Thing Happened on the Way to the Forum
 1967: The Odd Couple
 1969–70: George M!
 1971: Three Goats and a Blanket
 1971: Hide and Seek
 1971: W.C. (closed on the road)
 1972: Pulp
 1972–74: See How They Run
 1973: A Midsummer Night's Dream
 1975: Goodnight Ladies
 1975: Sugar
 1976: Alimony
 1979–82, 1983–88: Sugar Babies
 1983: Show Boat
 1986: The Laugh's On Me
 1987: A Funny Thing Happened on the Way to the Forum
 1989: Two for the Show
 1990: The Sunshine Boys
 1991–93: The Will Rogers Follies
 1993: Lend Me a Tenor
 1994: The Mind with the Naughty Man
 1995: Crazy for You
 1997–99: The Wizard of Oz
 2000: Hollywood Goes Classical
 2003: Singular Sensations
 2000–11: Let's Put On A Show

Short subjects

Box-office ranking 
For a number of years, film exhibitors regularly voted Rooney as one of the top money making stars in the country in the annual Quigley Poll:
1938 – 4th
1939 – 1st, 2nd (UK)
1940 – 1st, 1st (UK)
1941 – 1st, 1st (UK)
1942 – 4th, 1st (UK)
1943 – 9th, 6th (UK)
1944 – 18th
1945 - 25th

Television
Rooney made countless appearances in TV sitcoms and television films. He also lent his voice to many animation films. Only his most important work is listed in this section.

Awards and honors

Honors 
In May 1956, Rooney received an honorary PhD in Fine Arts from both Fremont College and degree mill Sequoia University for his work in the entertainment field.

On February 8, 1960, Rooney was initiated into the Hollywood Walk of Fame with a star heralding his work in motion pictures, located at 1718 Vine Street, one for his television career located at 6541 Hollywood Boulevard, and a third dedicated to his work in radio, located at 6372 Hollywood Boulevard. On March 29, 1984, he received a fourth star, this one for his live performances, located at 6211 Hollywood Boulevard.

He was the subject of a This Is Your Life programme in 1988, when he was surprised by Michael Aspel while appearing in Sugar Babies (musical) at London's Savoy Theatre.

In 1996, a Golden Palm Star on the Palm Springs Walk of Stars was dedicated to Rooney.

References

Rooney, Mickey
Rooney Mickey